DPP1 may refer to one of two enzymes:
Cathepsin C
Diacylglycerol diphosphate phosphatase